TATA-box binding protein like 2 is a protein that in humans is encoded by the TBPL2 gene. 
The TBPL2 protein is also known as TBP-related factor 3 (TRF3) and TATA binding protein 2 (TBP2). The protein was independently discovered in three laboratories as a vertebrate-specific family member of TATA-binding protein (TBP).
 
Orthologs have been identified in mouse, frog (Xenopus tropicalis) and fish (Danio rerio). Whereas the TBP gene is found in all eukaryotes, TBPL2 is only found in vertebrates.

Molecular properties 
Similar to TBP, TBPL2 can bind to the TATA box. It interacts with other general transcription factors such as TFIIA and TFIIB and promotes transcription initiation in vitro. 
The core domain, which mediates this binding to DNA, shows 95% identity between TBP and TBPL2. The N-terminal domain of TBPL2 exhibits only limited homology to that of TBP.

Expression and function 
Early reports mistakenly suggested a wide expression pattern of TBPL2. The main site of expression, however, is the oocyte, where it acts as a replacement factor for TBP.
Knockout mice are normal and viable, but females are not fertile in the absence of TBPL2 due to a defect in folliculogenesis. 
TBPL2 has also been identified as a factor necessary to reprogram stem cells to oocytes.

References

Further reading